Power cell may refer to:
 Battery (electricity), an array of galvanic cells for storing electricity.
 Electrochemical cell, a device that generates electricity from chemical reactions.
 Fuel cell, an electrochemical energy conversion chamber using reactants.
 Solar cell, a photovoltaic panel that converts light energy into electricity.